The Gate of Divine Might or Gate of Divine Prowess (Manchu:  šen u men) is the northern gate of the Forbidden City in Beijing, China.

History

The gate was built in 1420, during the 18th year of Yongle Emperor's reign. The Gate was originally named "Black Tortoise Gate", but when Qing Dynasty's Kangxi Emperor, whose birth name was Xuanye, ascended to the throne, the use of the Chinese character Xuan became a form of naming taboo.

The gate is the back gate of the palace, and was used by palace workers. Women being sent into the palace for selection as concubines also entered the palace through this gate.

It is important to note that the Xuanwu Gate Incident, while sharing a similar name with this gate's original name, did not take place at this gate. The palace coup happened during the Tang Dynasty, when the capital was in Chang'an.

References

External links
 

Gates of Beijing
Forbidden City
Ming dynasty architecture
Qing dynasty architecture